Lada Kaštelan (born 2 May 1961) is a Croatian dramatist and screenwriter.

Between 1987 and 2007, Kaštelan worked as a dramaturge at the Croatian National Theatre in Zagreb. Since 2007, she works as a professor at the Academy of Dramatic Art, University of Zagreb.

Kaštelan's screenplay for Fragments: Chronicle of a Vanishing, co-written with Zrinko Ogresta, received the Golden Arena for Best Screenplay at the 1992 Pula Film Festival. Her play Giga i njezini received the 1995 Marin Držić Award.

Sources

External links

1961 births
Croatian dramatists and playwrights
Croatian screenwriters
Writers from Zagreb
Academic staff of the University of Zagreb
Living people
Golden Arena winners